Theodore Green Apothecary, also known as Green's Pharmacy, is a historical building built in 1889, located at 500–502 Divisadero Street in San Francisco, California. It has been listed as a San Francisco Designated Landmark since 1986. As of 2022, the building operates as a privately owned bar.

History 

The Theodore Green Apothecary was designed by architect Samuel Newsom, for pharmacist and educator Franklin Theodore Green (1863–1944). The architecture features rounded oriel windows, oval windows, and arched windows, juxtaposed with sharp gables in the roof.

This building is a rare example of an unaltered 19th-century storefront within the city of San Francisco.

See also 
 List of San Francisco Designated Landmarks

References

External links 

San Francisco Designated Landmarks
1889 establishments in California
Victorian architecture in California
Queen Anne architecture in California